Cynoglossus carpenteri, commonly known as the Hooked tonguesole is a species of tonguefish. It is commonly found in the Indian Ocean.

References
Fishbase

Cynoglossidae
Fish described in 1889